A dolsot or gopdolsot is a small-sized piece of cookware or serveware made of agalmatolite, suitable for one to two servings of bap (cooked rice). In Korean cuisine, various hot rice dishes such as bibimbap or gulbap (oyster rice) as well as plain white rice can be prepared and served in dolsot. As a dolsot does not cool off as soon as removed from the stove, rice continues to cook and arrives at the table still sizzling.

On the bottom of a dolsot, there forms a thin crust of scorched rice, to be scraped off and eaten in the case of bibimbap, or made into sungnyung (숭늉, infusion) in the case of unseasoned rice dishes. In the former case dolsot can be brushed with sesame oil beforehand to facilitate scraping. To make sungnyung, the unscorched part of rice is scooped and transferred into another serving bowl right after served, and hot water or tea (usually mild grain teas such as barley tea or corn tea) is poured into the dolsot when it is still blistering hot. The infusion with loosened chunks of scorched rice remains warm til the end of the meal, when it is typically savoured.

Gallery

See also 

 Gamasot
 List of cooking vessels
 Ttukbaegi

References 

Cooking vessels
Serving vessels
Crockery
Korean cuisine
Korean food preparation utensils